Zaali Eliava (born 2 January 1985) is a retired football defender from Georgia.

Playing career

* - played games and goals

External links

Profile on FC Zestaponi Official Site

1985 births
Living people
Footballers from Georgia (country)
Georgia (country) international footballers
Expatriate footballers from Georgia (country)
FC Merani Tbilisi players
FC Tbilisi players
FC Sioni Bolnisi players
Expatriate footballers in Latvia
Skonto FC players
Expatriate sportspeople from Georgia (country) in Latvia
FC Lokomotivi Tbilisi players
FC Dinamo Tbilisi players
FC Zestafoni players
FC Sasco players
FC Torpedo Kutaisi players
FC Zugdidi players
FC Mertskhali Ozurgeti players
Association football defenders
Footballers from Tbilisi
Erovnuli Liga players